The Worshipful Company of Shipwrights is one of the ancient livery companies of the City of London. Although the Shipwrights' Company is no longer a shipbuilding trade association representing solely London-based industry, through its membership it retains strong links with global trade, and maritime and shipping professions.

The company ranks fifty-ninth in the City livery order of precedence and cohabits with the Ironmongers' Company.

Its motto is "Within The Ark Safe For Ever".

History of establishment
The Shipwrights' Company, unlike other livery companies, has not received a Royal Charter because maritime trade by definition was never confined within the boundaries of the Square Mile; instead a corporate body of London shipwrights grew over time, their first recorded reference being in the twelfth century; thus the company's status is considered as being incorporated "by prescription".

By contrast a Royal Charter was issued in 1612 to the "Master, Wardens, and Commonalty of the Art or Mystery of Shipwrights of Redriff (ie. Rotherhithe) in the County of Surrey". This led to a dispute about jurisdiction between the two companies, which was resolved in 1684 when the Rotherhithe charter was cancelled.

The Shipwrights' Company received confirmation of its City of London livery status in 1782.

Membership
Ever since Queen Victoria's reign the company continues to enjoy a special connection with the Royal Family, several of whom are liverymen today; Prince Charles was installed on 10 May 2011 as Prime Warden and served for 2011–2012 before succeeding his father, The Duke of Edinburgh, as Permanent Master Shipwright on 16 February 2012.

Whilst sons and daughters of members can join as freemen of the company, only those with a professional maritime background (military or commercial) may become liverymen. The company supports maritime research, numerous charities, as well as the work of the Lord Mayor of London, the City of London Corporation and the Sheriffs of the City of London. The company is also involved in charitable educational activities, which includes the support of the London Nautical School and George Green's School in London.

The current Clerk to the Shipwrights' Company is Lt-Col Richard Cole-Mackintosh, whose role combines that of executive officer as well as supporting the Prime Warden: Deputy Doug Barrow (for 2015–2016).

The company's Honorary Chaplain is the Revd. Canon Bill Christianson.

See also
 Shipbuilding (Shipwrights' origin)
 The Lord Clarke of Stone-cum-Ebony (Past Prime Warden Shipwright)
 The Lord Mountevans (Lord Mayor and Shipwright)
 Zunft (Germanic equivalent)

References

External links
 The Shipwrights' Company website

Livery companies
Corporatism
Medieval economics
1782 establishments in England
Shipbuilding organizations
Organisations based in London with royal patronage
Organisations based in the City of London
Naval architecture
Maritime organizations